Bryan Fortay (born November 2, 1971) is a former American football quarterback who played one season with the Miami Hooters of the Arena Football League (AFL). He first enrolled at the University of Miami before transferring to Rutgers University. He attended East Brunswick High School in East Brunswick, New Jersey. Fortay was also a member of the Frankfurt Galaxy of the World League of American Football (WLAF).

Early years
A 1989 graduate of East Brunswick High School in East Brunswick, New Jersey, Fortay was among the most sought after quarterbacks in the country his high school senior year. He was selected as a Junior Heisman award winner by the Downtown Athletic Club of New York and was the Bobby Dodd High School Back of the Year, as chosen by the Touchdown Club of Atlanta. He was named 1st team high school All-American by ESPN, Parade Magazine, Super Prep Magazine, Coca-Cola and the National High School Coaches Association. As a high school senior he once returned an interception 79 yards for a touchdown and was a First Team All State punter, averaging 42.1 yards per punt.  As a high school point guard in basketball, Fortay scored over 1,000 points while dishing out almost 400 assists and leading his high school basketball team to a 25–3 record and the Middlesex County Championship in 1987.

College career
He was one of the first true freshman to earn a varsity letter at quarterback for the University of Miami and a member of the 1989 National Championship team. After transferring from Miami to Rutgers, he threw for 2,374 yards and 25 touchdown passes for the Rutgers Scarlet Knights, breaking the Rutgers record for touchdown passes in a season and leading the Scarlet Knights to a 7–4 record his junior year.

Professional career
He also was a member of the Frankfurt Galaxy of the WLAF and a member of the team that won the WLAF championship in 1995. He played for the AFL's Miami Hooters in 1995, recording 17 passing touchdowns on 1,190 yards.

References

External links
Just Sports Stats
totalfootballstats.com
College stats
Official website

Living people
1971 births
American football quarterbacks
Miami Hurricanes football players
Rutgers Scarlet Knights football players
Frankfurt Galaxy players
Miami Hooters players
East Brunswick High School alumni
People from East Brunswick, New Jersey
Players of American football from New Jersey
Sportspeople from Middlesex County, New Jersey